Benteng may refer to:

 Benteng, Selayar Islands, the capital of Selayar Regency in South Sulawesi, Indonesia
 Benteng Stadium, a multi-use stadium in Tangerang, Indonesia
 Benteng railway station, a railway station in Surabaya, Indonesia

See also 

 FAW Besturn, also known as Benteng, a car series of First Automobile Works
 Benten
 Ben 10